The Funtech Entertainment Corporation (敦煌科技 - Dunhuang Technology) is a Taiwanese company responsible for the Super A'Can amongst other things such as Geographic Information Systems, office equipment and office supplies. It was a subsidy of UMC until it collapsed due to the failure of the Super A'Can.

References

Electronics companies of Taiwan
Software companies of Taiwan
Taiwanese brands